Nishtar is an administrative zone in Lahore, Punjab, Pakistan. It forms one of 10 zones of the Lahore metropolitan area.

Union councils

See also
Local government in Punjab

References